K. Puttaswamy may refer to:

 Kalastavadi Puttaswamy (1917–1978), Indian lawyer and Indian National Congress politician
 K. Puttaswamy (scholar) (born 1957), Kannada poet, scholar, critic, and playwright
 K. S. Puttaswamy (born 1926)